A bachelor tax is a punitive tax imposed on unmarried men. In the modern era, many countries do vary tax rates by marital status, so current references to bachelor taxes are typically implicit rather than explicit; and given the state of tax law is very complicated, as tax accountancy concepts like income splitting can come into play.

Such explicit measures historically would be instituted as part of a moral panic due to the important status given to marriage at various times and places (as in Ancient Rome, or in various U.S. state legislatures during the early 20th century). Frequently, this would be attached to racial (e.g., as part of Apartheid policies) or nationalistic reasons (as in Fascist Italy or Nazi Germany).

More recently, bachelor taxes were viewed as part of a general tax on childlessness, which were used frequently by member states of the Warsaw Pact.

Timeline

Rationale

Moral panic and homophobia 
During the 19th century in the United States, calls for a bachelor tax were frequently driven by a moral panic, and the bachelor tax was viewed as a way to reform social ills either because individuals believed that bachelors had a higher rate of delinquency, or because they believed that many bachelors were closeted homosexuals.

Racial-based eugenics 
The bachelor tax has a long history of being used for race-based pronatalism policies. In the early 20th century, this morphed into a general discussion of "race suicide", and consequently there was much literature supporting racial-based pronatalist policies, typically in the field of eugenics. After such measures were passed in South Africa in an attempt to align white birth rates with black rates, it passed to Benito Mussolini, who explicitly called for it to spread Italian progeny in a speech on May 26, 1927:
 Let us be quite clear: what are 40 million Italians compared to 90 million Germans and 200 million Slavs? What are 40 million Italians compared to 40 million Frenchmen, plus 90 million inhabitants of their colonies, or 46 million Englishmen plus 450 million people who live in their colonies?

Thereafter, the idea of the bachelor tax was passed over to Fascist Spain, Nazi Germany, was discussed in Bulgarian Fascist circles, and became a staple of Fascist propaganda in general.

Communist family planning 

Many Warsaw Pact countries instituted some form of a bachelor tax, such as the Soviet Union, Poland, Romania, and Bulgaria.  Typically, it formed a part of Communist natalist policies, the taxes on childlessness, and family planning policies that were instituted in Communist countries at around the same time in order to increase falling fertility rates.

Analysis and present day
Today, bachelor taxes have for the most part been superseded by the inclusion of marital status in the tax code. The first distinction in marital status as part of an income tax happened in the U.S. by 1930 after Poe v. Seaborn, where "income-splitting" was allowed in community property states. Therefore, until 1948, tax rates amongst married and bachelors differed based on one's state of residence. This disparity lead to joint-filing status being allowed by U.S. Federal tax law in 1948 to attempt to harmonize the tax code between community property and common law states.  After the war, joint filing and marital status began to be incorporated instead of explicit bachelor taxes into the U.S. tax system and soon spread to other tax systems around the world.

According to a 2010 study in the Journal of the Society for the Anthropology of Europe, the utility of the tax has been mixed, as analysis of past historical episodes have questioned the reliability of the tax to results in pronatalist outcomes. In Fascist Italy, it was found to be ineffective, as birth and marriage rates actually decreased. In the Soviet Union, the effect on the fertility rate of the policy was likewise inconclusive; and it was also found to be fairly regressive, as it tended to hit rural, poorer bachelors hardest. However, modern day implementations of taxation based on marital status in the U.S. has found a positive correlation with marriage rate.

See also
Aes uxorium
Community property
Family in the Soviet Union
Income tax in the United States#Marginal tax rates
Marriage penalty
Marriage promotion

References

General references

Inline citations

External links
The Roman Law Library, including Leges

Personal taxes
Natalism
Abolished taxes
Income taxes
Taxes promoting marriage and reproduction